Park Joo-sun (Korean: 박주선, born 23 July 1949) is a South Korean politician in Bareunmirae Party who was the president of the party along with Yoo Seong-min, and the Second Deputy Speaker of the National Assembly.

Biography 
Born at Boseong County, South Jeolla Province. Before he entered to politics, he worked as a prosecutor.

Political life 
His political career was started by ex-president Kim Dae-jung, in 1998. He was willing to run as one of the parliament members of Millennium Democratic Party in 2000, however, failed at the primary, so he ran as independent and finally won.

In 2016, he joined for newly-formed People's Party and also won at the new parliamentary election. As People's Party became the 3rd party, he was elected as the Second Deputy Speaker of the Parliament, whereas Shim Jae-chul as the First.

On 14 March 2017, just 4 days after the president Park Geun-hye was impeached from the office, he declared to run for the president. He became one of the candidates for the party's primary, but defeated by Ahn Cheol-soo.

In 2018, he was elected as the president of newly-formed Bareunmirae Party, along with Yoo Seong-min. He was formerly categorised as pro-DJ but not really, although he was expected to join for Party for Democracy and Peace. On the other hand, his choice was Bareunmirae Party and left from pro-DJs.

References 

1949 births
Living people
Deputy Speakers of the National Assembly (South Korea)
South Korean Buddhists
People from Boseong County
People's Party (South Korea, 2016) politicians